Sergius III was a duke of Naples.  He was preceded by his father, Marinus II and succeeded by his son, John IV.

10th-century dukes of Naples
11th-century deaths
Year of birth unknown